Larb (also spelled , ,  or ) is a type of Lao meat salad that is the national dish of Laos, along with green papaya salad and sticky rice. Larb is also eaten in other Southeast Asian countries where the Lao have migrated and extended their influence. Local variants of larb also feature in the cuisines of the Tai peoples of Shan State, Burma, and Yunnan Province, China.

History

Étienne François Aymonier, who visited Laos in 1883, described larb as a favorite dish of Lao people - a mixture of chopped onions or scallions, lemongrass leaves, fermented fish and chili mixed with fresh and boiled fish. The dish was eaten with steam-cooked sticky rice. Another French visitor, doctor Estrade, who arrived in 1893, described larb as a Lao main dish made with boiled fish, chili and ground roasted sticky rice.

Depending on the method of preparation, it may be known by different names, including nam tok, goi/saa, yum/sua, and can be made with beef, buffalo, chicken, duck, fish, pork, shrimp, game meat, mushroom or even algae. Larb can be served raw, which is known as larb diip (raw) or aharn suer (tiger food), or cooked, and usually served with a soup made with the bones of the meat being used.

Historically, larb dishes were more common to aristocrats and traditional recipes for larb served to Laotian royalty are in a collection of handwritten recipes from Phia Sing (1898-1967), royal chef and master of ceremonies. Larb is considered to be an auspicious and lucky dish because traditionally meat was not readily available, and most Laotians would normally eat larb at special occasions, such as wedding, New Year celebrations and festivals. Many Laotians will bless their family and guests with a meal consisting of larb for luck and good fortune. During the New Year celebration, many Lao families believe that eating larb on day one of the three-day celebration will bring good fortune for the rest of the year.

Prior to the collapse of the monarchy, in Laotian high society, servants were never allowed to prepare the best and most delicate dishes. The women of Laotian high society considered it an honorable task and great opportunity to display their culinary talents to prepare larb for their esteemed guests. Among ordinary Laotians, when preparing larb, housewives would prepare the ingredients in separate containers as a mise en place, leaving the final honor of mixing all the ingredients in a large bowl to the head of the household. As tradition goes, the head of the family would start with malaxating the mincemeat - softening and incorporating it with a cupful of stock from the soup, then adding the toasted ground rice, pepper powder, garlic, salt, padaek sauce and finally chopped aromatics before serving.

Types

Lao style
In Laos, depending on how the dish is prepared, it may be known by different names, including nam tok, goi/saa, yum/sua. Modern larb is most often made with chicken, beef, duck, fish, pork or mushrooms, flavored with fish sauce, lime juice, padaek, roasted ground rice and fresh herbs. The meat can be either raw or cooked; it is minced and mixed with chili, mint, roughly ground toasted rice (khao khoua) and, optionally, assorted vegetables according to personal preference. The dish is served at room temperature and usually with a serving of sticky rice and raw or fresh vegetables.
 Traditionally, beef larb will only contain offal, bile, and all of the other ingredients without lime juice. Fish and shrimp larb are also traditionally absent lime juice but incorporate minced galangal. Compared to other larb, fish and shrimp larb does required an extra step. The deboned fish filet, or shrimp is minced, then pounded in a mortar and pestle until it turns to a gluey paste.  Padaek juice is carefully add to the mixture, and stirred to a desired consistency, before finishing off with the finely chopped galangal and other aromatic herbs.

 Nam tok: Nam tok is a Lao and Thai word meaning 'waterfall'. The name is derived either from the dripping of the meat juices during the grilling or from the juices running out of the medium rare beef as it is sliced. It refers to a popular Lao meat dish in both Laos and Isan, where it is commonly known as ping sin nam tok (Laos) or nuea yang nam tok (Thailand). This dish can be regarded as a variation on the standard larb, and is made from barbecued pork or beef, usually the neck, which is sliced in bite-size pieces. The meat is then brought to a boil with some stock to create sauce. The heat is turned off, and then sliced shallots, ground roasted rice, chili powder, lime juice, and fish sauce are added, along with shredded coriander leaves, spring onions and mint leaves.
 Goi/Saa: Goi, Saa is a larb-like dish with the meat sliced thinly, rather than minced. In Luang Prabang and northern Laos this method of preparation is referred to as saa, whereas in Vientiane and southern Laos it is known as goi. Raw goi or saa made with the freshest and highest quality fish is served to the most honored guests because it is the most delicate and complicated dish to prepare. A properly made goi or saa requires great knife skills and talent. The raw fish is filleted, deboned and sliced. The fish is then left to soak in a marinade consisting of saltwater brine and lime juice for 2 up to a maximum of 15 minutes depending on preference. This denaturing of the proteins “cooks” the fish much like the Latin American dish ceviche. Once marinated, the meat is squeezed until dry to remove the excess liquid. The left-over marinade from the fish is then combined with padaek and brought to a boil before being left to cool to form a sauce. When everything is ready, the fish is mixed with the sauce, roasted rice powder, pepper flakes, and finely chopped aromatic herbs, such as fennel, galangal, lemongrass, Laotian parsley, shallot, green onions, and mint. The mixture can further be seasoned with more salt or lime to taste. The final dish is a pale pink fish salad with green aromatics and always served with the soup stock of the fish bone, fresh vegetables and sticky rice. A similar dish exists in Vietnam known as bo tai chanh.
 Yum/Sua: Another style more ancient, which was popular amongst the aristocrats and served to Lao royalty is yum gai tom (boiled chicken) or sua gai (chicken). The recipes for the royal yum gai tom is found in Phia Sing’s writing. Yum gai tom or sua gai is prepared by boiling a whole chicken with lemongrass, ginger, and kefir lime leaves. Once the chicken is cooked, the meat is removed from the carcass and chopped or shredded. Added to this are chopped cucumbers and tomatoes (optional), chili peppers, half-roasted shallots and garlic, and toasted rice powder. Broth is added to moisten, along with lime juice, and fish sauce. Pepper and salt are added to taste. It is finished with spring onions on top and coriander to garnish.

Tai Nyuan/Lan Na style

The larb from northern Thailand, larb Lan Na, is different from the internationally more well-known Lao style larb. The northern Thai larb of the Tai Nyuan/Khon Muang (northern Thai people) does not contain fish sauce and is not sour, as neither lime juice nor any other souring agent is used. Instead, the northern Thai version uses a mix of dried spices as flavoring and seasoning which includes ingredients such as cumin, cloves, long pepper, star anise, prickly ash seeds and cinnamon amongst others, derived from the location of northern Thailand's Lan Na Kingdom on one of the spice routes to China, in addition to ground dried chillies, and, in the case of larb made with pork or chicken, the blood of the animal. The dish can be eaten raw (larb dip), but also after it has been stir-fried for a short time (larb suk). If blood is omitted from the preparation of the stir-fried version, the dish is called larb khua. There is also a kind of larb called larb luat or lu. This dish is made with minced raw pork or beef, raw blood, kidney, fat and bile, and mixed with spices, crispy fried onions, fresh herbs and other ingredients. Larb and its other variations are served with an assortment of fresh vegetables and herbs, and eaten with glutinous rice. This version of larb is thought to have originated in the town of Phrae, in northern Thailand. This style of larb can also be found in parts of northern Laos.

Health risks of consuming raw

The risks from eating raw meat include contracting trichinosis, caused by an infectious worm, along with fatal bacterial or potentially rabies infection.
The consumption of raw larb and lu made with raw pork has led to several cases of human Streptococcus suis infections in Thailand, some of them with a deadly result.

The consumption of raw freshwater fish can lead to an infection by Opisthorchis viverrini (Southeast Asian liver fluke), a parasitical flatworm that can live for many years inside the human liver. Northern Thailand, where certain fishes are consumed fermented, has the highest recorded rate of medically untreatable cholangiocarcinoma.

See also
 Cuisine of Laos
 Koi (dish)
 Gỏi - Vietnamese salad
 List of meat dishes
 List of salads
 Thai salads

References

External links
 Laap, an Ethno Culinary Journey

Isan cuisine
Hmong cuisine
Meat dishes
National dishes
Salads
Ground meat
Potentially dangerous food
Raw beef dishes
Lao cuisine